Michiel van Nispen (born 14 October 1982) is a Dutch politician, he has been a member of the House of Representatives of the Netherlands for the Socialist Party since 2 April 2014, when he replaced Jan de Wit.

Van Nispen studied Dutch law at Tilburg University between 2000 and 2004. He then joined a law firm and did a master's degree in international and European public law between 2006 and 2007. Since then he worked for the Socialist Party group in the House of Representatives, occupying himself with the topic of Justice.

References

External links
  Mr. M. (Michiel) van Nispen, Parlement.com

1982 births
Living people
21st-century Dutch jurists
21st-century Dutch politicians
Members of the House of Representatives (Netherlands)
People from Breda
Socialist Party (Netherlands) politicians
Tilburg University alumni
20th-century Dutch people